Taft Heights (formerly, Boust City) is a census-designated place (CDP) in Kern County, California, United States. The population was 1,949 at the 2010 census, up from 1,865 at the 2000 census.

Geography

History
The place was originally called Boust City in honor of E.J. Boust, an oilman who founded the town.

Demographics

2010
At the 2010 census Taft Heights had a population of 1,949. The racial makeup of Taft Heights was 1,602 (82.2%) White, 15 (0.8%) African American, 35 (1.8%) Native American, 11 (0.6%) Asian, 0 (0.0%) Pacific Islander, 220 (11.3%) from other races, and 66 (3.4%) from two or more races. Hispanic or Latino of any race were 441 people (22.6%).

The whole population lived in households, no one lived in non-institutionalized group quarters and no one was institutionalized.

There were 674 households, 297 (44.1%) had children under the age of 18 living in them, 306 (45.4%) were opposite-sex married couples living together, 112 (16.6%) had a female householder with no husband present, 59 (8.8%) had a male householder with no wife present.  There were 78 (11.6%) unmarried opposite-sex partnerships, and 3 (0.4%) same-sex married couples or partnerships. 145 households (21.5%) were one person and 54 (8.0%) had someone living alone who was 65 or older. The average household size was 2.89.  There were 477 families (70.8% of households); the average family size was 3.32.

The age distribution was 589 people (30.2%) under the age of 18, 260 people (13.3%) aged 18 to 24, 475 people (24.4%) aged 25 to 44, 451 people (23.1%) aged 45 to 64, and 174 people (8.9%) who were 65 or older.  The median age was 29.3 years. For every 100 females, there were 98.9 males.  For every 100 females age 18 and over, there were 91.5 males.

There were 776 housing units at an average density of 2,560.2 per square mile, of the occupied units 345 (51.2%) were owner-occupied and 329 (48.8%) were rented. The homeowner vacancy rate was 3.9%; the rental vacancy rate was 9.5%.  923 people (47.4% of the population) lived in owner-occupied housing units and 1,026 people (52.6%) lived in rental housing units.

2000
As of the census of 2000, there were 1,865 people, 676 households, and 484 families living in the CDP. The racial makeup of the CDP was 88.20% White, 0.54% Black or African American, 1.45% Native American, 0.91% Asian, 0.97% Pacific Islander, 5.63% from other races, and 2.31% from two or more races.  13.14% of the population were Hispanic or Latino of any race.

Of the 676 households 37.0% had children under the age of 18 living with them, 51.9% were married couples living together, 12.3% had a female householder with no husband present, and 28.3% were non-families. 21.4% of households were one person and 9.0% were one person aged 65 or older.  The average household size was 2.76 and the average family size was 3.20.

The age distribution was 31.8% under the age of 18, 10.0% from 18 to 24, 27.6% from 25 to 44, 18.8% from 45 to 64, and 11.8% 65 or older.  The median age was 30 years. For every 100 females, there were 100.5 males.  For every 100 females age 18 and over, there were 96.9 males.

The median household income was $37,684 and the median family income  was $37,944. Males had a median income of $36,098 versus $21,765 for females. The per capita income for the CDP was $14,485.  About 17.2% of families and 18.0% of the population were below the poverty line, including 27.2% of those under age 18 and 3.7% of those age 65 or over.

References

Census-designated places in Kern County, California
Census-designated places in California